Vekenega is a Slavic name which contains word "vek", "vijek" - age and "niega" - delight.

People
Vekenega - Croatian 11th century nun from the House of Madi
Vekenega Profaca - Croatian swimmer
M. Vekenega Križanac - Croatian nun

External links
Vekenega Profaca
M. Vekenega Križanac

Slavic given names